Carl Lowry Brumbaugh (September 22, 1906 – October 24, 1969) was an American college and professional football player who was a quarterback and halfback in the National Football League (NFL) for nine seasons in the 1930s.  Brumbaugh played college football for Ohio State University and the University of Florida, and thereafter, he played professionally for the Chicago Bears, Cleveland Rams and Brooklyn Dodgers of the NFL.

Early years 

Brumbaugh was born in West Milton, Ohio in 1906, and attended West Milton High School.

College career 

After graduating from high school, he attended Ohio State University in Columbus, Ohio and then the University of Florida in Gainesville, Florida, where he played for the Ohio State Buckeyes football team and the Florida Gators football team, respectively.  He played for the Gators in 1926, 1927, and 1928, and Brumbaugh, Rainey Cawthon, Clyde Crabtree and Royce Goodbread were members of the 1928 Gators' "Phantom Four" backfield that helped the team lead the country with 336 points scored.  The Gators finished the 1928 season 8–1, losing only to the Tennessee Volunteers by a single point, 13–12.  Brumbaugh was later inducted into the University of Florida Athletic Hall of Fame as a "Gator Great."

Professional career 

Brumbaugh was a member of the legendary early 1930s Bears teams that included future hall of famers Red Grange and Bronko Nagurski, won the NFL Championships in 1932 and 1933, and played for a third in 1934.

Brumbaugh died in his hometown of West Milton, Ohio on October 24, 1969; he was 63 years old.

See also 

 Defunct National Football League franchises
 History of the Chicago Bears
 List of Chicago Bears players
 List of St. Louis Rams players
 List of University of Florida alumni
 List of University of Florida Athletic Hall of Fame members

References

Bibliography 

 Carlson, Norm, University of Florida Football Vault: The History of the Florida Gators, Whitman Publishing, LLC, Atlanta, Georgia (2007).  .
 Golenbock, Peter, Go Gators!  An Oral History of Florida's Pursuit of Gridiron Glory, Legends Publishing, LLC, St. Petersburg, Florida (2002).  .
 Hairston, Jack, Tales from the Gator Swamp: A Collection of the Greatest Gator Stories Ever Told, Sports Publishing, LLC, Champaign, Illinois (2002).  .
 McCarthy, Kevin M.,  Fightin' Gators: A History of University of Florida Football, Arcadia Publishing, Mount Pleasant, South Carolina (2000).  .
 McEwen, Tom, The Gators: A Story of Florida Football, The Strode Publishers, Huntsville, Alabama (1974).  .
 Nash, Noel, ed., The Gainesville Sun Presents The Greatest Moments in Florida Gators Football, Sports Publishing, Inc., Champaign, Illinois (1998).  .

External links 

 

1906 births
1969 deaths
American football halfbacks
American football quarterbacks
Brooklyn Dodgers (NFL) players
Chicago Bears players
Cleveland Rams players
Florida Gators football players
Ohio State Buckeyes football players
People from West Milton, Ohio
Players of American football from Ohio